Jimmy Young may refer to:

Jimmy Young (American football) (born 1987), NFL wide receiver for the Pittsburgh Steelers
Jimmy Young (boxer) (1948–2005)
Jimmy Young (broadcaster) (1921–2016), English singer and radio personality
Jimmy Young (sportscaster), radio host for Boston Celtics games
 James Young (comedian) (1918–1974) Northern Irish actor and comedian also known as Our Jimmy.

See also
Jim Young (disambiguation)
James Young (disambiguation)